Lisa Ellen Hensley is the associate director of science at the Office of the Chief Scientist, National Institute of Allergy and Infectious Disease Integrated Research Facility in Frederick, Maryland. She was previously a civilian microbiologist in the virology division of the United States Army Medical Research Institute of Infectious Diseases (USAMRIID). Hensley is one of the premier researchers of some of the world's most dangerous infections, including Ebola hemorrhagic fever, Lassa fever, the coronavirus diseases Severe acute respiratory syndrome (SARS) and Middle East respiratory syndrome (MERS), and smallpox. She has been involved in research uncovering critical mechanisms in the pathogenesis of hemorrhagic fever viruses, and has used those discoveries to develop candidate therapeutic drugs for their treatment.

Hensley is a native of Winston-Salem, North Carolina. Before working with USAMRIID, she worked as a staff fellow at the National Institute of Diabetes and Digestive and Kidney Diseases, part of the National Institutes of Health (NIH). She also held graduate teaching and research posts at the University of North Carolina at Chapel Hill, where she achieved her Ph.D. (advisor Ralph S. Baric), and at Duke University Medical Center in Durham, North Carolina.
Hensley joined USAMRIID in 1998 as a research associate in the Pathology Division. She has co-authored over 180 publications in peer-reviewed scientific journals on a variety of infectious disease topics. She now serves as the Chief of Viral Therapeutics, Virology Division at USAMRIID.

A 2006 Lancet article co-authored by Hensley published results on progress for treatment of Marburg virus, a severe hemorrhagic virus with potential utility as a biological weapon. The study tested the efficacy of a new post-exposure vaccine for Marburg using a rhesus macaque model. It found that rhesus monkeys exposed to the vaccine survived a high-dose lethal challenge of Marburg for at least 80 days, while the control monkeys died after day 12. A co-authored 2005 paper in PLOS Medicine reviewed the development of a vaccine for Lassa fever, for which there are currently no vaccines licensed. Their trial vaccine elicited a protective immune response in nonhuman primates, and when infected with Lassa, they showed no evidence of clinical disease.

Hensley is the subject of a chapter in journalist Richard Preston's 2002 book Demon in the Freezer, which covers the history of smallpox eradication and the current debates over remaining smallpox stocks. In Chapter 5, “A Woman With a Peaceful Life,” Preston recounts Hensley's beginnings as a researcher with USAMRIID and her eventual recruitment to the CDC to collaborate on smallpox research. Hensley was part of the team responsible for the first nonhuman smallpox infection (in monkeys), proving the potential for continued live-animal smallpox research. Some would argue that the experiment's success bolsters the argument of "retentionists", who oppose elimination of smallpox stores largely so that they can continue to be researched.

In 2007, Hensley was recognized as one of the year's "Ten Outstanding Young Americans" (TOYA) by the United States Junior Chamber (Jaycees). The award honors Americans ages 18–40 who “exemplify the best attributes of the nation’s young people.”  In 2008, she was selected as one of the year's Ten Outstanding Young Persons of the world ("TOYP") by JCI (Junior Chamber International).  Similar to the TOYA award, this program recognizes young people who excel in their chosen fields and exemplify the best attributes of the world's young people.

Works consulted 
Daddario-DiCaprio, Kathleen M. “Postexposure protection against Marburg haemorrhagic fever with recombinant vesicular stomatitis virus vectors in non-human primates: an efficacy assessment.” The Lancet 367.9520 (2006): 1399-1404
Civilian Personnel Online. “Army Civilians Profile of the Month: Oct 2007 Profile of the Month—Dr. Lisa Hensley.” Accessed 13 Jan 2014.
Preston, Richard. Demon in the Freezer. New York, NY: Random House, 2002.

References

American microbiologists
Women microbiologists
American virologists
People from Winston-Salem, North Carolina
American women biologists
Living people
Year of birth missing (living people)
21st-century American women scientists